Melitaea didyma, the spotted fritillary or red-band fritillary, is a butterfly of the family Nymphalidae.

Description 
Melitaea didyma is a medium-sized butterfly with a wingspan reaching . The overside of the wings is a bright orange-brown with dark brown markings arranged in rows, which are quite variable in quantity and size. Sometimes the colour of the females is a duller orange, shaded with grey-green. The underside of the wings is chequered pale yellow and pale orange. M. didyma has seasonal forms and sexual dimorphism.
The male is fiery red, with a narrow dentate black distal border and a moderate number of small black dots and spots, which are dispersed over the basal half of the wing and end with a short band extending beyond the cell from the costa into the disc. On the underside, which is very abundantly marked with small black dots and hooks, a flexuose subbasal band and a curved submarginal one are situated on a delicately greenish, or yellowish, white ground. In the female the forewing and the anal area of the hindwing are much paler, being moreover dusted with blackish, while the costal half of the hindwing has preserved the red tint : the whole wings are much more abundantly but less prominently marked with black. There occur sometimes specimens with a blue gloss on the upperside.

Biology
This butterfly flies from March to October depending on the location.
This species has two or three generations and  overwinters as young caterpillar.

The larvae feed on various plants, including Linaria, Plantago lanceolata, Veronica, Centaurea jacea and Digitalis purpurea.

Distribution 
It is found in southern and central Europe, North Africa, the Middle East, central Asia and Siberia. It is absent from northern Europe (England, Ireland, northern France, Germany, Poland and Scandinavia).

Habitat 
Melitaea didyma prefers flowery and grassy areas, meadows and roadsides.

Subspecies 
The species is divided into the following subspecies:

 Melitaea didyma didyma
 Melitaea didyma elavar Fruhstorfer, 1917
 Melitaea didyma kirgisica Bryk, 1940
 Melitaea didyma neera Fischer de Waldheim, 1840
 Melitaea didyma occidentalis Staudinger, 1861
 Melitaea didyma turkestanica Sheljuzhko, 1929
 Melitaea didyma ambra Higgings, 1941

Images of life cycle

References 

 Guide des papillons d'Europe et d'Afrique du Nord, Delachaux et Niestlé, Tom Tolman, Richard Lewington
 Russian insects
 Catalogue of life

External links 

 AdaMerOs – Butterflies of Turkey
 Papillons du Poitou-Charente
 Euro butterflies
 Butterfly-guide
 Moths and Butterflies of Europe and North Africa

Melitaea
Butterflies of Africa
Butterflies of Europe
Butterflies of Asia
Fauna of Pakistan
Insects described in 1778
Taxa named by Eugenius Johann Christoph Esper